Son Hyeon-mi (born 2 November 1972) is a South Korean judoka. She competed in the women's heavyweight event at the 1996 Summer Olympics.

References

1972 births
Living people
South Korean female judoka
Olympic judoka of South Korea
Judoka at the 1996 Summer Olympics
Place of birth missing (living people)
Asian Games medalists in judo
Judoka at the 1994 Asian Games
Asian Games bronze medalists for South Korea
Medalists at the 1994 Asian Games
Universiade bronze medalists for South Korea
Universiade medalists in judo
20th-century South Korean women